Jumpy is a play by April De Angelis

Productions 
Jumpy had its premiere at the Royal Court Theatre on 19 October 2011, following previews from 13 October. It played a limited run to 19 November 2011.

Directed by Nina Raine, the cast included Tamsin Greig, Doon Mackichan, Seline Hizli, Richard Lintern, James Musgrave, Bel Powley, Ewan Stewart, Sarah Woodward and Michael Marcus.

The production transferred to the Duke of York's Theatre with an opening night on 28 August 2012, following previews from 16 August. The production ran until 4 November 2012.

Awards and nominations

References 

2011 plays